The 1981 football season is Clube de Regatas do Flamengo's 86th year of existence, their 70th football season, and their 69th season in the top division of the Campeonato Carioca, the Rio de Janeiro state football league. In addition, it is their 11th in the top division of the Brazilian national football league, having never been relegated from either. Internationally, Flamengo participated in the 1981 Copa Libertadores, qualifying through winning the 1980 Brazilian Série A Championship.

The 1981 season is regarded as the most successful and iconic season in Flamengo's history, in which they captured their first ever Copa Libertadores championship and defeated European Cup champions Liverpool by a score of 3 – 0 in the Intercontinental Cup in Tokyo, Japan. The team accomplished the feat of winning three trophies (the Copa Libertadores final, the Campeonato Carioca final, and the Intercontinental Cup) in a span of 21 days. This made Zico's Flamengo only the second Brazilian club to win a Mundial (world championship), after Pelé's Santos.

Friendlies

National friendly 
Flamengo played one pre-season match against São Paulo before the start of the national league season.

Copa Punta del Este 
The 1981 Copa Punta del Este was a friendly invitational tournament contested by Flamengo, Grêmio, Peñarol of Uruguay, and the Seleção of Maldonado, the state capital near Punta del Este, Uruguay. It was played in a single-elimination format with semi-finals and a final. Both Brazilian clubs eliminated the Uruguayan squads in the semi-finals in February 1981.

Following that, heavy rain in Uruguay and diminished interest from the organizers in a final without Peñarol delayed the final between Grêmio and Flamengo for nearly three months. It was ultimately played outside of Uruguay, at the Estádio Olímpico, in Porto Alegre. Scheduled to be played at 21:00, The match was further delayed an hour and a half due to a power outage. At nearly 1:00 the following morning the match was decided by coin toss: president Dunshee de Abranches selected 'heads' and the tournament was awarded to Flamengo.

Torneio João Havelange 
The 1981 João Havelange Tournament was a three-team interstate friendly competition hosted by Democrata of Minas Gerais and named in honor of João Havelange, the Brazilian president of FIFA. Flamengo's state rivals Vasco da Gama won the tournament after defeating Democrata (3 - 2) and Flamengo (1 – 0).

At this time, Zico and Júnior of Flamengo were at Wembley Stadium representing the Seleção against England, with Zico scoring the lone goal in a 1 – 0 win.

Torneio Internacional de Nápoles 

In the middle of their Carioca campaign, Zico and Flamengo traveled to Italy for a pair of friendlies in the Naples International Tournament. Flamengo, Avellino, and Northern Irish club Linfield were hosted by Napoli at the Stadio San Paolo. In front of a crowd of 80,000 Zico impressed against Ruud Krol and third-place Serie A team Napoli, scoring a hat trick. It would be the first time many Italians saw the Brazilian, before the 1982 World Cup in Spain and his eventual move to Udinense in 1983.

Paulo César Carpegiani testimonial 
During the Campeonato Carioca, and with one eye looking ahead to the Copa Libertadores semi-final stage in October, Flamengo scheduled a match with Argentine giants Boca Juniors and their rising superstar Diego Maradona. Both teams rested their starters in preceding matches before this friendly at the Maracanã in front of 65,000 and broadcast on live television. The "Taça da Raça" match served as a farewell to Flamengo midfielder Paulo César Carpegiani, who had already retired from play and was serving as Flamengo's manager (eventually leading the club to a first Libertadores title and world championship in a matter of months).

The two icons, Zico (28 years old) and Maradona (20), had not yet met on the field and fans were clamoring to watch the two face each other. Zico scored both goals of the match, and Maradona had a scoring chance at the end of the first half. The two would meet again representing their nations in the 1982 World Cup, with Zico scoring and Maradona being sent off.

Campeonato Brasileiro (Taça de Ouro) 
Flamengo qualified for the 1981 Brazilian Championship (officially the Taça de Ouro or "Gold Cup") through finishing 3rd in the 1980 Campeonato Carioca. Grêmio were ultimately champions of the league with Flamengo finishing 6th overall out of 44 total participating teams.

First phase 
Group D

Second phase 
Group L

Round of 16

Quarterfinals

Campeonato Carioca 

The important Rio de Janeiro state league schedule coincided with Flamengo's Copa Libertadores matches of the same year. Paulo César Carpegiani was a player and occasional starter for Flamengo in the first round of the Carioca, also serving as Dino Sani's assistant and eventually taking over as manager for the Carioca second round.

After finishing top in the first round Taça Guanabara and qualifying for the final, Flamengo turned their focus to the Libertadores group stage during the second round, which Vasco da Gama went on to win. In the third round, Flamengo's 6 – 0 thrashing of rival Botafogo was historic, and avenged their match in 1972 with the reverse scoreline. Flamengo captured the third round with their most wins, and the most goals scored and best goal differential of the competition.

Flamengo entered the final against Vasco with two rounds won (compared to Vasco's one round) and the most overall points across the three rounds. At a single match final in the Maracanã, a draw would be sufficient for Flamengo to become state champions. If Flamengo lost, a rematch would be a played and a draw would again give the title to Flamengo. A loss would force a third and final match.

Days before the final, tragedy struck Flamengo as former manager Cláudio Coutinho died while scuba diving the Ilhas Cagarras archipelago near Rio de Janeiro. Vasco were victorious in the match, 2 – 0, both goals scored by Roberto Dinamite. In the second match, Flamengo supporters cite rainy weather as the reason for their team's poor performance, losing again to Vasco by a final-minute goal from Dinamite.

On December 6, Flamengo won the decisive match with first half goals from Adílio and Nunes. Ticão scored for Vasco late in the second half, and as the team attempted to mount a comeback and force extra time, a Flamengo-supporter bricklayer invaded the pitch and started a confrontation with a Vasco player. Play was stopped for eight minutes as Nunes separated the bricklayer. Flamengo held on to win and earn their 21st Rio de Janeiro state championship.

First round (Taça Guanabara)

Second round (Taça Ney Cidade Palmeiro)

Third round (Taça Sylvio Corrêa Pacheco)

Finals

Copa Libertadores 
The 1981 edition of the Copa Libertadores was Flamengo's debut season in the tournament. Flamengo qualified as champion of 1980 Campeonato Brasileiro (Atlético Mineiro qualified as runners-up). Flamengo would go on to win the tournament, undefeated until the final against Chilean newcomers Cobreloa.

In the first group stage, the Brazilian entrants were paired with both Paraguayan clubs: Cerro Porteño and Olimpia. Flamengo had to travel away to Asunción for their last two matchdays and needed at least 3 points to catch Atlético Mineiro (only the top team in the group would advance). Former player and assistant Paulo César Carpegiani assumed the role of manager from Dino Sani after their second draw against Atlético on the 4th matchday. Flamengo were equal on points with the club from Belo Horizonte and forced a play-off at the neutral Estádio Serra Dourada in Goiânia. However the match was suspended after 37 minutes as Atlético were reduced to only six eligible players (Osmar, Chicao, Palinha, Reinaldo and Eder were sent off). Per regulation, victory was awarded to Flamengo.

Flamengo advanced through the semi-final group with a dominant performance: four victories in four matches. In the final, they encountered another Libertadores debutante in Cobreloa, a club that had only been founded four years prior. In the first final at the Maracanã, Flamengo prevailed (2 – 1) with two goals from Zico. In the National Stadium in Santiago the following week (not in Cobreloa's home town of Calama), the Brazilians were pressured on the field and, according to Zico, injured by Cobreloa players hiding rocks in their hands, and disadvantaged by the Uruguayan referee Ramón Barreto. Victor Merello scored the only goal of the match on a free kick.

Equal on goals, a third match was played at the neutral venue of the Estadio Centenario in Montevideo. If the third match ended in a draw, extra time would be played. If still tied, the trophy would be awarded to Cobreloa based on away goals. Zico scored twice in the first half, sealing the game and the championship. With the match won, Anselmo of Flamengo entered on in the final minutes for the sole purpose of hurting Cobreloa captain Mario Soto in revenge. Both were sent off. Flamengo were crowned Champions of America, and returned to Brazil to dispute the Rio de Janeiro state league final, with a match against Liverpool in Tokyo confirmed for December.

Group stage 
Group 3

Semi-finals 
Group A

Finals

Intercontinental Cup 

A week after conquering the Campeonato Carioca against Vasco, Flamengo flew to Tokyo to contest the Intercontinental Cup (also branded as the Toyota Cup) against European Cup champions Liverpool. A number of the key players on both squads had shared the field with each other earlier in the year, in an international friendly at Wembley in May, including Zico and Júnior of Flamengo and Terry McDermott and Phil Neal of Liverpool.

The 1981 edition was the second such championship to be played as a single neutral-venue match in Tokyo's National Stadium. Flamengo won 3 – 0 off two goals from Nunes and one from Adílio, officially being declared world champions by FIFA. This marks Flamengo's first and only world championship (as of 2018).

Overview

Goal scorers

Honors

References

External links 
CONMEBOL Official Website: Copa Libertadores History
ImortaisDoFutebol.com: Esquadrao Imortal - Flamengo 1980-1983

CR Flamengo
1981 in Brazilian football